Choi Soon-sil (born June 23, 1956) is an individual known primarily for her involvement in the 2016 South Korean political scandal, which stemmed from her influence over the 11th President of South Korea, Park Geun-hye.

Biography
Choi Soon-sil was born on June 23, 1956 as the fifth daughter in her family. Choi's father is Choi Tae-min, who was the leader of a cult combining various elements of Buddhism, Christianity, and traditional Korean Shamanism. Her mother is Im Sun-yi. She is alleged to have founded the "Eight Fairies" group associated with the impeachment of President Park Geun-hye.

She claimed to have entered Dankook University in 1975. However, upon later research it was discovered that she was only auditing classes. She was married to Kim Young-ho from 1982 to 1986 and they had a son in 1983. She was then married to Chung Yoon-hoi from 1995 to 2014, and they had a daughter in 1996, dressage athlete Chung Yoo-ra. Chung Yoon-hoi had served as secretary to Choi Soon-sil's father, Choi Tae-min, and served as chief of staff to President Park Geun-hye during her time as a congresswoman in the National Assembly.

Choi's relationship with Park Geun-hye is believed to trace back to at least 1977. During her college years, Choi was the president of the National College Student Union, a student organization whose purpose was to “establish an uptight identity, a determined patriotism, and an independent value system”. On June 10, 1977, the union held an opening meeting in Hanyang University that was attended by Park Geun-hye, the daughter of then-president Park Chung-hee, where the leader of the Saemaul peace corps sat to the right of Park and future president Lee Myung-bak sat to her left.

During the 1980s, Choi started managing a real estate business and operating kindergartens. In 1983, she acquired a 45-pyong (about 149 square meters) parcel of land in Yeoksam-dong, Seoul. In September 1985, she acquired a 108-pyong (about 347 square meters) parcel of land in Sinsa-dong, where she built a 4-story building and operated a kindergarten in the building. In July 1988, she bought a 200-pyong (about 661 square meters) parcel of land in Sinsa-dong under a joint-contract with a partner. Later, Choi bought back the joint shares of her partner and became the sole owner of the property. From 1992 to 1996, Choi established and operated Jubel GmbH jointly with Chung Yoon-hoi, who she would marry during this period. In July 2003, Choi invested in the construction of a building with 7 floors above ground and 2 floors underground, which was later referred to as "M building". Chung Yoon-hoi's company was a tenant in this building. In February 2008, Choi sold the kindergarten building to a savings bank.

In 1989, Choi translated a child-care instruction book entitled How To Hold Your Children’s Habit Upright with Kim Kwang-Ung. This book stated that Choi was the vice president of a research center affiliated with the Korea Institute of Culture.

In 2006, Park Geun-hye was attacked by a person with a razor while attending the election campaign of Seoul mayoral candidate Oh Se-hoon as the leader of Grand National Party. Choi Soon-sil looked after Park while she was hospitalized. After leaving the hospital, Park continued to receive treatment at the home of Choi Soon-sil's older sister, Choi Soon-deuk.

At the outbreak of the 2016 political scandal, Choi operated a café and an Italian restaurant called “Testa Rossa" in Nonhyeon-dong, located in Gangnam, Seoul. The business had been operating since December 2014 in a remodeled building, where the first and second floor served as the café and restaurant and the third floor served as Choi's private office. An insider gave testimony that stated Choi had been meeting with politicians, influential businessmen, and business tycoons on the 2nd and 3rd floors of this building.

2016 South Korean political scandal

In 2016, Choi was involved in a scandal that alleged that she was responsible for masterminding governmental policy and decision-making during Park's administration. After these allegations arose, prosecutors ordered raids on offices and homes linked to Choi, where further evidence to support the claims were found. It is also alleged that Choi ordered Korean prosecutors to indict Japanese journalist Tatsuya Kato, Seoul Bureau chief of Sankei Shimbun, on defamation charges after he reported that President Park and Chung Yoon-hoi had a secret seven-hour meeting with Choi after the sinking of MV Sewol during an extended period after the sinking in which President Park could not be contacted.

On October 31, 2016, Choi met with prosecutors. Choi told reporters, “Please, forgive me. I’m sorry. I committed a sin that deserves death”. On November 20, Choi Soon-sil was officially charged by the prosecutors for intervening in state affairs and using her influence to force chaebols to donate tens of millions of dollars to foundations and businesses she controlled.

On 23 June 2017, the Seoul Central District Court found Choi guilty of charges of obstruction of duty by using her presidential ties to get her daughter admitted to Ewha Womans University and receive good grades, and sentenced her to three years of imprisonment. On 13 February 2018, the Seoul Central District Court found Choi guilty of charges of abuse of power, bribery, and interfering in government business, which extended her prison sentence by 20 years and ordered her to pay a fine of ₩18 billion (US$16.6 million).

References

Living people
1956 births
People from Seoul
South Korean women in business
South Korean criminals
Park Geun-hye
Presidential advisors
People associated with the 2016 South Korean political scandal
20th-century South Korean businesspeople
21st-century South Korean businesspeople
People convicted of bribery